Samma  is a village in northern Jordan, located 80 kilometers north of the capital Amman and about 18 km West of the city Irbid.

It lies in the Al-Taybeh Department is one of the nine departments that constitute the Irbid Governorate , It covers 13.76 km2 and has a population of  15761 people (as of 2015).

History 
In 1596 it appeared in the Ottoman tax registers named as Samma, situated in the nahiya (subdistrict) of Bani Kinana, part of the Sanjak of Hawran. It had 19 households and 13 bachelors; all Muslim. The villagers paid a fixed tax-rate of 25% on agricultural products; including wheat, barley, summer crops, olive trees/fruit trees, goats and bee-hives; in addition to occasional revenues. The total tax was 4,000 akçe.

In 1838  Samma's inhabitants were predominantly Sunni Muslims and Greek Christians.

In 1885, Gottlieb Schumacher visited the village and wrote about it in his book "Northern Ajlun within the Decapolis":

In 1961 the population of Samma was 1,649 inhabitants.

Population 
Depending on The Population and Housing Census report released in late February 2016:

Population: 15761
Male: 8048
Female:  7713
Families: 3113

Gallery

See also
Irbid Governorate

References

Bibliography

 
 

Villages in Irbid governorate